Orthocomotis sucumbiana is a species of moth of the family Tortricidae. It is found in Sucumbíos Province, Ecuador.

The wingspan is 22 mm. The ground colour of the forewings is cream white, but greyish in the dorsal area and between some costal spots, as well as sprinkled with brown and orange, with groups of green scales. The hindwings are greyish brown.

Etymology
The species name refers to the name of Sucumbíos Province.

References

Moths described in 2007
Orthocomotis